Notorious is an American documentary television series that profiles the lives of infamous individuals in history. The series aired on The Biography Channel.

Most episodes of Notorious are rehashes of the similar television shows American Justice and Mobsters, both series that were originally broadcast on A&E, Biography Channel's sister channel. The only difference between the series is the introduction of the episodes and the lead-in after commercials.

2004 American television series debuts
2007 American television series endings
2000s American documentary television series
The Biography Channel shows
English-language television shows